Sprout Brook is a hamlet in the Town of Canajoharie in Montgomery County, New York, United States. New York State Route 163 (NY 163) passes through the hamlet, as does Bowmans Creek.

See also 
 Van Deusenville, New York
The birthplace of Henry J. Kaiser a captain of industry.

References 

Hamlets in New York (state)
Hamlets in Montgomery County, New York